The seventh and final season of the American television series Legends of Tomorrow, which is based on characters from DC Comics, premiered on The CW on October 13, 2021 and ended on  March 2, 2022, consisting of 13 episodes. It is set in the Arrowverse, sharing continuity with the other television series of the universe, and is a spin-off of Arrow and The Flash. The season was produced by Berlanti Productions, Warner Bros. Television, and DC Entertainment, with Phil Klemmer and Keto Shimizu serving as showrunners.

The season was announced in February 2021. Principal cast members Caity Lotz, Tala Ashe, Jes Macallan, Olivia Swann, Adam Tsekhman, Shayan Sobhian, Lisseth Chavez, Amy Louise Pemberton, Nick Zano, and Matt Ryan return from previous seasons.

Episodes 

<onlyinclude>{{Episode table |background=#EC716C |caption=Legends of Tomorrow, season 7 episodes |overall=5 |season=5 |title=22 |director=13 |writer=26 |airdate=12 |prodcode=7 |viewers=10 |country=U.S. |episodes=

{{Episode list/sublist|Legends of Tomorrow (season 7)
 | EpisodeNumber = 110
 | EpisodeNumber2 = 13
 | Title = Knocked Down, Knocked Up
 | DirectedBy = Kevin Mock
 | WrittenBy = Phil Klemmer & Keto Shimizu
 | OriginalAirDate = 
 | ProdCode = T13.23213
 | Viewers = 0.46
 | ShortSummary = Gary lands in 30,000 B.C., but returns to the manor. The Legends learn that Gwyn died at the fixed point in 1916 Mametz Wood, France. Gary deduces that Sara is pregnant (due to her alien biology) and her regenerative abilities transfer to the baby. The Legends travel to before Gwyn's death, but are intercepted by Gideon who tells them to leave. Astra and Spooner convince her to turn against AI Gideon, who uploads herself into a clone body. Gideon disables the Waverider'''s cloaking, causing her clone to become an anomaly. She self-destructs in the Temporal Zone, but Astra shields her group and reforms the Waverider. The others meet with Mike, the Fixer. Gwyn states that anyone attempting to change the battle would be erased in a time paradox making Mike feel useless. He destroys Gwyn's machine and steals the Waverider to talk to his superiors. Nate rescues Alun, but is permanently depowered by mustard gas. Afterward, Sara reveals her pregnancy to Ava, while Nate retires to the Wind Totem. Mike returns with the Waverider, but he and the Legends are arrested by his superiors.
 | LineColor = EC716C
}}
}}</onlyinclude>

 Cast and characters 

 Main 
 Caity Lotz as Sara Lance / White Canary
 Tala Ashe as Zari Tomaz and Zari Tarazi
 Jes Macallan as Ava Sharpe
 Olivia Swann as Astra Logue
 Adam Tsekhman as Gary Green
 Shayan Sobhian as Behrad Tarazi
 Lisseth Chavez as Esperanza "Spooner" Cruz
 Amy Louise Pemberton as Gideon
 Nick Zano as Nate Heywood / Steel
 Matt Ryan as Gwyn Davies

 Recurring 
 Giacomo Baessato as J. Edgar Hoover

 Guest 
 Alexandra Castillo as Gloria Cruz
 Brandon Routh as Ray Palmer
 Victor Garber as Martin Stein
 Franz Drameh as Jefferson "Jax" Jackson
 Arthur Darvill as Rip Hunter
 Courtney Ford as Nora Darhk
 Wentworth Miller as Leonard Snart / Captain Cold
 Raffi Barsoumian as Bishop
 Falk Hentschel as Carter Hall / Hawkman
 Aubrey Reynolds as Maude Beaumont
 Hamza Fouad as Eddie
 Sage Brocklebank as Ross Bottoni
 Christopher Britton as Thomas Edison
 Matthew Clarke as Erwin George Baker
 Kimleigh Smith as a female factory worker
 Jason Gray-Stanford as Mr. Staples
 Ego Mikitas as General Kalashnik
 Stefanie von Pfetten as Irina Petrov
 Giles Panton as Harris Ledes
 Timothy Webber as the Time Authority
 Matt Letscher as Eobard Thawne
 Tom Forbes as Alun Thomas
 Donald Faison as Mike / Booster Gold

 Notes 

 Production 

 Development 
In February 2021, The CW renewed Legends of Tomorrow'' for a seventh season. Paiman Kalayeh and Mercedes M. Valle joined the writer's room, while Leah Poulliot and Emily F. Cheever were promoted to staff writers. Phil Klemmer and Keto Shimizu return as co-showrunners.

Casting 
Main cast members Caity Lotz, Tala Ashe, Jes Macallan, Olivia Swann, Adam Tsekhman, Shayan Sobhian, Lisseth Chavez, Amy Louise Pemberton, Nick Zano and Matt Ryan return as Sara Lance, Zari Tarazi, Ava Sharpe, Astra Logue, Gary Green, Behrad Tarazi, Esperanza Cruz, Gideon and Nate Heywood respectively. In February 2021, Dominic Purcell, who stars as Mick Rory / Heat Wave, indicated he would leave the series after the seventh season as it was the last on his contract. However, two months later, he announced he would be leaving the series after the sixth season, but would return periodically in the seventh; he ultimately did not appear outside of archive footage in the 100th episode. In July, it was announced that Ryan would be playing a new character named Gwyn Davies, rather than return as John Constantine, and that Pemberton, who voices Gideon, and who had occasionally played a human version of her character in past seasons, will be playing human Gideon full-time.

In October, it was announced that former series regular Wentworth Miller would return for the 100th episode. The following week, former series regulars Victor Garber, Brandon Routh, Courtney Ford, Arthur Darvill, Franz Drameh, and Falk Hentschel were also confirmed to return. The following January, former series regular Matt Letscher returned for two episodes.

In February, Donald Faison was revealed to be appearing in the season finale in an undisclosed role, later revealed to be Booster Gold. Following the season finale, it was announced that regardless of whether or not an eighth season would be ordered, this season would be Zano's last appearance as a series regular. Zari Tomaz, who was portrayed by Tala Ashe as a main character in seasons three and four before returning in a recurring capacity from season five, exited the series at the end of this season with Nick Zano. Tala Ashe stayed on as Zari Tarazi.

Filming 
Filming began on July 12, 2021, and concluded on December 16.

Release 
The season premiered on The CW on October 13, 2021, and consisted of thirteen episodes. The season finale aired on March 2, 2022, and was not intended to be the series finale even though an eighth season had not yet been ordered. Despite this, the series was cancelled on April 29, 2022.

Reception

References

External links 
 

Legends of Tomorrow seasons
2021 American television seasons
2022 American television seasons